Gérard Lanthier (born 3 April 1956) is a French former professional footballer who played as an attacking midfielder.

International career 
Lanthier was an Olympic and military international for France.

Post-playing career 
After retiring from football, Lanthier worked as the director of a ready-to-wear store in his native Lyon. He would then go on to coach three different football clubs, Avignon, SC Montfavet, and Arles, before becoming an administrative agent for the town of Avignon.

Honours 
Paris Saint-Germain
 Coupe de France runner-up: 1984–85

References

External links 
 
 

1956 births
Living people
Footballers from Lyon
French footballers
Association football midfielders
French football managers
Olympique Lyonnais players
AC Avignonnais players
AJ Auxerre players
Paris Saint-Germain F.C. players
Stade Rennais F.C. players
Nîmes Olympique players
US Orléans players
Paris FC players
Lyon La Duchère players
Ligue 1 players
Ligue 2 players
French Division 3 (1971–1993) players